The Lake Kurumoi rainbowfish (Melanotaenia parva) is a species of freshwater rainbowfish in the  subfamily Melanotaeniinae. It was endemic to West Papua in Indonesia. Its natural habitat was only the small Lake Kurumoi in the Bird's Head Peninsula. It is primarily threatened by habitat loss, however it is unknown if the wild population still exists as it has probably been extirpated from its entire native range.

Sources

Lake Kurumoi rainbowfish
Freshwater fish of Western New Guinea
Lake Kurumoi rainbowfish
Taxonomy articles created by Polbot